UDAY Express or Utkrisht Double Decker Air Conditioned Yatri Express are completely Double-Decker AC chair car trains designed by Indian Railways. The coaches of the train have an anti-graffiti vinyl wrapped exterior and have been given a bright color scheme of yellow, orange and pink - somewhat similar to that of the Tejas Express. The train service has been envisioned as a 'luxury' train service for business travelers. According to Indian Railways, Uday Express will cater to the "busiest routes" and increase carrying capacity by 40%. These trains have a seating capacity of 120 per coach (50 for upper deck, 48 for lower deck and 22 on the ends) as compared to Shatabdis which can seat up to 78.

The first service was launched on June 10, 2018 between Coimbatore Junction and Bangalore. and it also have halts at Krishnarajapuram, Kuppam, Salem Jn, Erode Jn, Coimbatore Jn 
 

The second service was launched on September 26, 2019 between Visakhapatnam and Vijayawada and have 7 stops Enoute.

Active services

Proposed services

References

External links